Punctapinella niphastra is a species of moth of the family Tortricidae. It is found in Espírito Santo, Brazil.

References

Moths described in 1931
Euliini